Komsomolsky is a rural locality (a settlement) and the administrative center of Kalashnikovskoye Rural Settlement, Pallasovsky District, Volgograd Oblast, Russia. The population was 1,285 as of 2010. There are 15 streets.

Geography 
Komsomolsky is located on the Caspian Depression, 65 km of Pallasovka (the district's administrative centre) by road. Vishnevka is the nearest rural locality.

References 

Rural localities in Pallasovsky District